Rose Rose I Love You is a 1993 Hong Kong comedy film directed by Jacky Pang and starring Tony Leung, Kenny Bee, Simon Yam, Carina Lau, Veronica Yip and Charine Chan. The film is a sequel of the 1992 film 92 Legendary La Rose Noire, with Leung reprising his role as from the predecessor, but features a new storyline. It was followed by another sequel, confusingly titled Black Rose II, released in 1997, also featuring a new storyline and cast.

Plot
Thief Micky was arrested by police detectives Keith Lui and Leung Sing-po while attempting to steal a priceless diamond called "Star of Malaysia". However, when this priceless gem goes missing, Micky frames Black Rose for stealing it, causing an uproar.

One night, Micky escapes from prison while Keith and Sing-po were ordered to bring him back to justice. The two had devised an ingenious scheme to get close to Micky's ex-lover, Pearl Chan, in order to search for clues. Meanwhile, Black Rose disguises herself as a civilian under the name of Beauty, and gets close to Keith in order to clear her name, which causes a lot of headaches for Keith. Micky proceeds to retrieve the key to the "Star of Malaysia" from Pearl, who turns out to be the incarnation of White Rose, Black Rose's rival. Pearl has been investigating the whereabouts of the gem, but unbeknownst to her, the key was hidden in a necklace that she regularly wore, and Micky successfully retrieves the key. However, Mickyu's girlfriend, Lulu (Charine Chan), turns out to be White Rose's follower and tricks Micky into giving out the key. When Black Rose learns of this, she also proceeds to take the key and prove her innocence. At this time, Keith and Sing-po realize the true identities of their respective love interests, Beauty and Pearl. To get back the key, Micky ties a bomb around him and threatens to kill everyone.

Cast
Tony Leung Ka-fai as Keith Lui
Kenny Bee as Leung Sing-po
Simon Yam as Micky
Carina Lau as Pearl Chan / White Rose
Veronica Yip as Beauty / Black Rose
Charine Chan as Lulu / White Rose No. 3 
Bowie Lam as Tam Tak-cheung
Ku Feng as Angry dad of Tam's girlfriend
Lo Hung as School headmaster / White Rose No. 2
Tommy Leung as Keith's superior officer
Jameson Lam as White Rose's gang member

Reception

Critical
Andrew Saroch of Far East Films gave the film a score of three over five stars and describes the humor as "surreal, yet often engaging in a kind of baffling way." LoveHKFilm gave the film a mixed review describing the plot as not "making any sense", and also praising Tony Leung Ka-fai's comic charm.

Box office
The film grossed HK$21,929,420 at the Hong Kong box office during its theatrical run from 27 March to 30 April 1993.

References

External links

Rose Rose I Love You at Hong Kong Cinemagic

1993 films
1993 comedy films
1993 martial arts films
Hong Kong martial arts comedy films
Hong Kong slapstick comedy films
Police detective films
Hong Kong vigilante films
Hong Kong sequel films
1990s Cantonese-language films
Films set in Hong Kong
Films shot in Hong Kong
Regal Entertainment films
1990s martial arts comedy films
1990s Hong Kong films